Captain William Drummond Matheson MC was a Canadian World War I flying ace credited with five aerial victories.

Sergeant Matheson was promoted to temporary 2nd lieutenant (on probation) on 12 November 1916. He continued to serve with #25 Squadron from 12 Nov 1916 - 16 March 1917. 
Wounded by machine gun fire, his left foot had to be amputated. After his hospitalization in Canada, on 2 Oct 1918 he was posted to the School of Special Flying; 
and on 19 Dec 1918 he was again posted, this time to Headquarters.

His citation for the Military Cross, published in the Supplement to the London Gazette, states:

List of aerial victories
See also Aerial victory standards of World War I.

References

External links

1890 births
Canadian World War I flying aces
Canadian recipients of the Military Cross
People from New Glasgow, Nova Scotia
Year of death missing